"Every Little Thing She Does Is Magic" is a song by British rock group the Police from their fourth album, Ghost in the Machine. The song, notable for featuring a pianist (uncommon in Police songs), dates back to a demo recorded in the house of Mike Howlett in the autumn of 1976. It was also a hit single that reached the top of the charts in the United Kingdom (topping its predecessor, "Invisible Sun") in November 1981 and hit  on the US Billboard Hot 100 chart that same year.

Composition
"Every Little Thing She Does Is Magic" is in the key of D major, in 4/4 and at 162bpm. It is characterised as a new wave, pop rock and power pop song with elements of reggae. Unlike other Police songs, it features an arrangement dominated by piano and synthesisers. The lyrics concern unrequited love, telling the story of a hapless romantic who has attempted to pursue a romantic interest for a long period of time, but is too afraid to do so.

Background
Although the song was recorded in 1981, Sting wrote it as early as late 1976 prior to the formation of the Police. An early (1976) demo of the song can be heard on the Strontium 90 album Strontium 90: Police Academy, which Sting recorded entirely by himself while the song was still fresh in his mind (according to Mike Howlett), using equipment in the loft of Howlett's home in Acton, London which included an acoustic guitar, a bass guitar, an African drum, a TEAC 4-track recorder and some cheap microphones. For Howlett, this demo is "a powerful testimony to the raw, undiluted talent that is Sting". The recording was made prior to the launch of the Portastudio in the late 70s, which Sting would later use for writing and demoing songs for the Police and so on. A second demo was recorded in January 1981 at Le Studio in Morin Heights, Canada, with Nick Blagona engineering:

The piano part was added by session keyboardist Jean Roussel, whom Sting would fly over to help re-record the track against the wishes of his bandmates Andy Summers and Stewart Copeland while they were recording the Ghost in the Machine album at AIR Studios, Montserrat. Summers did not approve of Roussel's inclusion in the track, claiming that he was "incredibly pushy" and that "there wasn't room for him. He must have played 12 piano parts on that song alone." Copeland, however, said that Roussel "wasn't pushy ... He was just like us actually."

Feeling that the arrangement of the track was not enough like the Police style, Summers (who recalled, "as the guitar player I was saying, 'What the fuck is this? This is not the Police sound'") and the band tried to "Police-ify" the track by attempting different arrangements and styles, but none of them clicked. However, as Copeland remembers, the remaining two members of the band had to overdub onto Sting’s demo in the end:

In the chorus, Sting, not knowing any other word which would rhyme with "magic," used the word "tragic." Copeland said of this moment, "I remember Sting for years trying to think of a rhyme for 'magic', as in 'Every Little Things She Does Is Magic.' I think the only word he could come up with, apart from 'tragic', was 'pelagic', which means 'ocean going'. There I was in my leather pants and punk hairdo, pondering the distinction between ocean-going and river-going fish." This moment was, in his estimation, implied by scholars to be fairly comical.

Release and reception
"Every Little Thing She Does Is Magic" was released as the second single from Ghost in the Machine in UK and Ireland, while in most other parts of the world it was the debut single from the album. The song outperformed its predecessor in Britain, where it topped the charts. The song also hit No. 1 in Canada, Ireland and the Netherlands, No. 2 in Australia, and No. 5 in Norway. It reached No. 3 in America, making it and "King of Pain" the band's second-best-performing single there, after its No. 1 hit "Every Breath You Take".

The lyrics of the second verse, "Do I have to tell the story / Of a thousand rainy days since we first met? / It's a big enough umbrella / But it's always me that ends up getting wet," were reprised by Sting at the end of the song "O My God" issued on the band's next album. These lyrics were repeated once more in "Seven Days" on Sting's solo album Ten Summoner's Tales. He later re-recorded the song in an orchestral version for his album Symphonicities.

Record World said that "There's urgency here that demands repeated listening." The song received a positive retrospective review from AllMusic journalist Chris True, who praised the lyrics and described the song as "pop brilliance".  Ultimate Classic Rock critic Mike Duquette rated the song as the Police's 4th best, calling it "a heart-pounding love song for the ages."

The song's B-side, "Flexible Strategies", was reportedly an improvised jam that was created in response to the record company's demand for a B-side. Stewart Copeland claims, "Word came down from the marketing machine 'Create a B-side – today! We walked over to the gear, strapped on, and played for ten minutes. A disgrace."

Personnel
Sting – bass guitar, lead and backing vocals
Andy Summers – guitars
Stewart Copeland – drums
Jean Alain Roussel – pianos, synthesizers, arrangement

Track listing

7-inch: A&M / AMS 8174 (UK)
 "Every Little Thing She Does Is Magic" – 3:58
 "Flexible Strategies" – 3:44

7-inch: A&M / AMS 9170 (NL)
 "Every Little Thing She Does Is Magic" – 4:05
 "Shambelle" – 5:10

7-inch: A&M / 2371-S (US)
 "Every Little Thing She Does Is Magic" – 3:58
 "Shambelle" – 5:06

Chart performance

Weekly charts

Year-end charts

Certifications

See also
 List of European number-one hits of 1981
 List of number-one singles from the 1980s (UK)
 List of number-one mainstream rock hits (United States)

References

1976 songs
1981 singles
The Police songs
European Hot 100 Singles number-one singles
Irish Singles Chart number-one singles
Number-one singles in the Netherlands
RPM Top Singles number-one singles
UK Singles Chart number-one singles
Songs written by Sting (musician)
Song recordings produced by Hugh Padgham
A&M Records singles